Daniel Klaidman published Kill or Capture: The War on Terror and the Soul of the Obama Presidency in June 2012.
The book describes the United States Government's tactics for dealing with individuals suspected of a role in supporting terrorists who have targeted or plan to target the United States.

According to Michael Petrou, writing in Maclean's Magazine, 
"This book is about the clash between President Barack Obama’s pre-election idealism on matters of security and terrorism, and the more pragmatic realities of office.".

Commenting on President Barack Obama's decision to authorize the killing United States citizen Anwar Awlaki via a missile fired by an unmanned aerial vehicle Steve Coll wrote:

References

2012 non-fiction books
American political books
Houghton Mifflin books